The 1992 Hi-Tec British Open Championships was held at the Lambs Squash Club with the later stages being held at the Wembley Conference Centre from 8–13 April 1992. Jansher Khan won his first title defeating Chris Robertson in the final.

Seeds

Draw and results

Final Qualifying round

Main draw

References

Men's British Open Squash Championships
Men's British Open
Men's British Open Squash Championship
Men's British Open Squash Championship
Squash competitions in London
Men's British Open Squash Championship